Wuhua County Stadium is a multi-purpose stadium in Wuhua County, Meizhou, Guangdong, China.

Wuhua County Stadium opened in 1986 for the football preliminaries of 1987 National Games of China. It became the home stadium of Meizhou Hakka in August 2013 for the 2013 China League Two. The stadium was renovated to meet the requirement of the league at the end of 2015 after Meizhou Hakka won promotion to China League One.

References

Football venues in China
Athletics (track and field) venues in China
Sports venues in Guangdong
Multi-purpose stadiums in China